Stepmom is a 1998 American comedy-drama film directed by Chris Columbus and produced by Wendy Finerman, Mark Radcliffe, and Michael Barnathan. The screenplay was written by Gigi Levangie, Jessie Nelson, Steven Rogers, Karen Leigh Hopkins, and Ronald Bass. The film stars Julia Roberts, Susan Sarandon, and Ed Harris, and follows a terminally ill woman dealing with her ex-husband's new lover, who will be their children's stepmother.

Stepmom was released in the United States on December 25, 1998, by Sony Pictures Releasing. Despite receiving mixed reviews from critics, the film was a box office success, grossing $159.7 million worldwide against a budget of $50 million. Among other accolades, Sarandon was nominated for a Golden Globe Award for Best Actress in a Motion Picture – Drama for her performance.

Plot
Jackie and Luke Harrison are a divorced New York City couple struggling to co-parent their children Anna and Ben. Luke, an attorney, is living with his girlfriend of one year, Isabel Kelly, a successful fashion photographer several years his junior.

Isabel, who has never wanted to be a mother, tries hard to make Anna and Ben feel comfortable with her. Anna repeatedly rejects her overtures while Ben, who likes her, adds extra complications with his mischievousness. Isabel behaves with contempt tempered by caution around Jackie, believing she overcompensates for the divorce by spoiling her children.

Jackie, a former publisher turned stay-at-home mom, treats Isabel coldly, seeing her as an immature, selfish, overly ambitious career woman. She also continues to harbor malice towards Luke, as seen in confrontations about Isabel's parenting. After many arguments and hurt feelings involving Isabel, Jackie, and Anna, Luke proposes to Isabel, making her Anna and Ben's future official stepmother. This causes even more friction.

In a plot twist, Jackie has been silently battling lymphoma for some time, and the results of her latest scans say the disease is now terminal. She experiences a range of negative emotions, specifically jealousy of the woman who she feels is replacing her, and anger that after all of the sacrifices she made for her children, she will never see them grow up. Jackie actively sabotages Isabel's effort to bond with the children, even to the point of refusing to allow Isabel to take Anna to see Pearl Jam and then later taking her to the concert herself.

Isabel and Anna's relationship eventually improves, and they bond over shared hobbies: painting and music. Isabel confronts Jackie, so she informs Luke and the children of her diagnosis, resulting in Anna emotionally storming out. That night, Jackie loosens up the tension by singing and dancing to "Ain't No Mountain High Enough" with Anna and Ben.

Jackie and Isabel continue to have disagreements, largely over Isabel's parenting. When Ben goes missing on Isabel's watch, Jackie threatens legal action and claims that she has never lost him, which she later admits to be untrue. At school, Anna is bullied by a boy she once liked and the two women give her conflicting advice, causing more tension.

Jackie later invites Isabel to have dinner with her, and they work out a shaky truce, coming to terms with Jackie's impending passing and Isabel's role of stepmother. They bond when Isabel reveals her admiration of Jackie's maternal instincts, while Jackie in turn praises Isabel's hipness as a means to connect with Anna. Isabel finally lets her guard down when she tells Jackie her biggest fear is that on Anna's wedding day, all she will wish for is her mother's presence, while Jackie admits her own fear is that she will forget her. They come to understand that while Jackie will always have the children's past, Isabel will have their future, and the children can love them both without choosing.

On Christmas morning, the family gathers to celebrate together. Jackie, now largely bedridden, shares emotional moments with her children individually, telling them that she will remain with them as long as they remember her. Isabel takes a family portrait of Luke and Jackie with the children. Jackie demonstrates her acceptance of Isabel by inviting her to join them, stating, "Let's get a photo with the whole family." Isabel sits next to Jackie for the photo and as the closing credits begin, both women are shown side by side, holding hands and at peace with each other.

Cast
 Julia Roberts as Isabel Kelly
 Susan Sarandon as Jackie Harrison
 Ed Harris as Luke Harrison
 Jena Malone as Anna Harrison
 Liam Aiken as Ben Harrison
 Lynn Whitfield as Dr. Sweikert
 Darrell Larson as Duncan Samuels
 Mary Louise Wilson as School Counselor
 Andre B. Blake as Cooper
 Herbert Russell as Photo Assistant
 Jack Eagle as Craft Service Man

Reception
Stepmom opened at No. 2 at the North American box office behind Patch Adams making $19.1 million USD in its opening weekend. It stayed at the second spot for another week. The film grossed $91,137,662 in the United States and $159,710,793 worldwide from a budget of $50 million.

Stepmom received mixed reviews from critics. It has a 44% rating on Rotten Tomatoes based on 93 reviews, with an average score of 5.3/10. The site's consensus reads: "Solid work from Julia Roberts and Susan Sarandon isn't enough to save Stepmom from a story whose manipulations dilute the effectiveness of a potentially affecting drama". On Metacritic, the film holds a score of 58 out of 100 based on reviews from 21 critics, indicating "mixed or average reviews". Audiences polled by CinemaScore gave the film an average grade of "A" on an A+ to F scale.

Susan Sarandon was nominated for the Golden Globe Award for Best Actress – Motion Picture Drama and won the San Diego Film Critics Society Award for Best Actress. Ed Harris won the National Board of Review Award for Best Supporting Actor for his roles in Stepmom and The Truman Show.

Soundtrack
The soundtrack to Stepmom was released on August 12, 1998 via Sony Classical label.

Certifications

Remake
Karan Johar decided to adapt Stepmom for the Indian audience. Although he initially intended to buy the rights to the film, he eventually opted to co-produce it with Sony Pictures. The version titled We Are Family (2010) starring Kajol, Arjun Rampal, and Kareena Kapoor was released to mixed reviews and received average returns.

See also
 The Other Woman (1995 film)
 We Are Family, a 2010 Indian remake of this film.

References

External links
 
 
 

1998 films
1492 Pictures films
1990s female buddy films
1990s buddy comedy-drama films
1998 comedy-drama films
1990s English-language films
American comedy-drama films
American female buddy films
American buddy comedy-drama films
Columbia Pictures films
TriStar Pictures films
Films about cancer
Films about dysfunctional families
Films about mother–daughter relationships
Films directed by Chris Columbus
Films produced by Chris Columbus
Films produced by Michael Barnathan
Films scored by John Williams
Films set in New York City
Films shot in New Jersey
Films shot in New York (state)
Films with screenplays by Ronald Bass
1990s American films